The 1999 IIHF Women's World Championship qualification process was contested between 10 teams competing for the three final places in the championships. The other seven teams would join Japan (the 6th Place team from the 1998 Olympic games), in the newly formed Pool B.

Teams

The following is the nations that competed, and the stage at which they entered the qualification process:

At Pre-Qualification (nations ranked 9th through 12th at the last European Championship) 

At Final Qualification (nations ranked above 9th who did compete in the Nagano Olympics)

Format

The four teams in the Pre-Qualification group would play a single round robin, with the top two proceeding to the Final Qualification.

The eight teams in Final Qualification would be split into two groups of four, with the top two teams automatically qualifying for the World Championship, and a single match playoff at a neutral location to decide the final qualifier.

Pre-Qualification

Group stage

Standings

Czech Republic and France advanced to the Final Qualification. Slovakia and Netherlands qualified for Pool B.

Results

Final Qualification

Group A

Standings

Germany qualifies for the World Championship. Russia advances to the Final Playoff. France and Denmark qualified for Pool B.

Results

Group B

Standings

Suitzerland qualifies for the World Championship. Norway advances to the Final Playoff. Czech Republic and Latvia qualified for Pool B.

Results

Final Playoff
The final playoff was held two days after the main tournaments were finished in the town of Zuchwil in Switzerland

Russia qualifies for the World Championship. Norway  qualifies for Pool B.

Final standings

Qual
Qual
Qualification for sports events